Ross 47 is a variable star of spectral type M4 located in the constellation Orion, 19 light-years from Earth.

References

Orion (constellation)
M-type main-sequence stars
0213
J05420897+1229252
026857
Orionis, V1352
BY Draconis variables